Slobodan Grubačić was Dean of the Faculty of Philology at the University of Belgrade. He is an elected member of  Serbian Academy of Sciences and Arts. Father of Andrej Grubacic. Son of Emilija Grubačić and Kosta Grubačić.

Honors and awards
Grubačić has been awarded a Humboldt Prize and membership of the National Committee for Cooperation with UNESCO. He is an elected member of the Association of Writers of Serbia and is a member of the European Academy of Sciences and Arts.

Some key publications
Grubačić, Slobodan (2006) Alexandria Lighthouse. Post-Modern Interpretations of the Alexandrian School
Karlovci-Srem Novi Sad: Izd. knjižarnica Zoran Stojanovic

Grubačić, Slobodan (2008) The Spirit and Understanding (anthology), Belgrade: Informatics

Grubačić, Slobodan (2009) History of German Culture  Sremski Karlovci-Novi Sad: Publishing knjižarnica Z. Stojanovic

References

Academic staff of the University of Belgrade
Members of the European Academy of Sciences and Arts
Living people
Year of birth missing (living people)